Boulder Canyon may refer to:

Places
 Boulder Canyon (Boulder Creek), the canyon of Boulder Creek (Colorado)
 Boulder Canyon (Colorado River), the Colorado River canyon above Hoover Dam flooded by Lake Mead
 Boulder Canyon, South Dakota, a census-designated place in the Black Hills